Chiyoda International School Tokyo (CHIST) (Japanese: 千代田インターナショナルスクール東京) was founded and opened by Musashino University in 2018.

CHIST has grades 1–5, and grades 6 &10. The school is a private coeducational institution. CHIST has the standard array of educational subjects and programs. It is located in the central ward of Chiyoda-ku and is currently in the candidacy phase for the International Baccalaureate (IB) Primary Years, Middle Years, and Diploma Programmes.

References

Schools in Tokyo
Chiyoda, Tokyo
2018 establishments in Japan